Mathe or Mathé or Máthé may refer to:
Mathematics

Given name
Mathé Altéry (born 1927), French soprano singer

Surname
Annanias Mathe (c. 1976–2016), Mozambique criminal
Antoine Félix Mathé (1808–1882), French politician
Édouard Mathé (1886–1934), French silent film actor
Félix Mathé (1834–1911), French politician
Gábor Máthé (footballer) (born 1985), Hungarian football player
Gábor Máthé (lawyer) (born 1941), Hungarian lawyer
Gábor Máthé (tennis) (born 1985), Hungarian male tennis player
Georges Mathé (1922–2010), French oncologist and immunologist
Henri Mathé (1837–1907), French politician
Ketty Mathé (born 1988), French judoka
Lew Mathe (1915–1986), American bridge player
Pierre Mathé (1882–1956), French farmer and politician
Vasily Mathe (1856–1917), Russian artist and engraver
Zsuzsa Mathe (born 1964), Hungarian artist

Films
Mathe Haditu Kogile, Kannada language film
''Mathe Mungaru, Kannada language film